The 2018 Boodles Challenge was an exhibition tournament held before Wimbledon to serve as a warm-up to players. Taking place from 26 June to 30 June 2018 at Stoke Park in London, it was the 17th edition of the Boodles Challenge. As with last year, no player was declared champion.

Participants

  Radu Albot
  Kevin Anderson
  Victoria Azarenka
  Liam Broady
  Pablo Carreño Busta
  Juan Martín del Potro
  Fabio Fognini
  Taylor Fritz
  Malek Jaziri
  Thanasi Kokkinakis
  Sebastian Korda
  Nick Kyrgios
  Benoît Paire
  Andrea Petkovic
  Vasek Pospisil
  Monica Puig
  Sam Querrey
  Albert Ramos Viñolas
  Andreas Seppi
  Sergiy Stakhovsky
  Bernard Tomic
  Stefanos Tsitsipas
  James Ward
  Marcus Willis
  Alexander Zverev

Results

Day 1 (26 June)

Day 2 (27 June)

Day 3 (28 June)

Day 4 (29 June)

Day 5 (30 June)

References

Boodles Challenge
Boodles Challenge
2018 sports events in London
2018 in English tennis
Boodles Challenge